Antonina Grigoryevna Ivanova Vaschenko (25 December 1932 in Taganrog – 23 March 2006 in Moscow) was a Soviet shot putter. She participated in the 1972 Summer Olympics, placing seventh in the qualifying round, with a throw of 17.87 meters, then ninth in the final round, with a long throw of 18.28 meters. She participated in the annual European Athletics Indoor Championships from 1970 until 1973, placing 6th, 3rd, 2nd and 3rd, successively. She placed fourth at the 1971 European Athletics Championships.

She held the Masters shot put world record for women aged 35-39 from 1981 until 1980. She has held the Masters shot put world record for women aged 40-44 since 1973.

References

Иванова (Ващенко) Антонина Григорьевна, Спорт-страна.ру 
All Time World Records - Shot Put, Masters Athletics

Soviet female shot putters
Athletes (track and field) at the 1972 Summer Olympics
Olympic athletes of the Soviet Union
1932 births
2006 deaths
Sportspeople from Rostov Oblast